The Endeavour Award, announced annually at OryCon in Portland, Oregon, is awarded to a distinguished science fiction or fantasy book written by a Pacific Northwest author or authors and published in the previous year. 

Annual presentation of the Endeavour Award is in November at OryCon for books published during the previous year.

Award history
The Endeavour Award, named for HM Bark Endeavour, the ship of Northwest explorer Captain James Cook, was first presented in 1999. It was funded by a collaboration of Portland, Oregon area writers and readers of science fiction and fantasy in 1996 and chartered by Oregon Science Fiction Conventions, Inc. (OSFCI) tax-exempt non-profit corporation.

Past winners

References

External links
Official website

Regional and local science fiction awards